Łyczanka  is a village in the administrative district of Gmina Siepraw, within Myślenice County, Lesser Poland Voivodeship, in southern Poland.

The village has an approximate population of 500.

References

Villages in Myślenice County